8G or 8-G can refer to:

Angel Air (IATA: 8G), a Thai airline
RIM-8 Talos, also MQM-8G, a long-range naval surface-to-air missile
The 8G Band, the house band for Late Night with Seth Meyers
Luscombe 8G, a model of Luscombe 8 aircraft